King Cat is a 1967 Hong Kong martial arts film directed by Hsu Tseng Hung and produced by Shaw Brothers Studio. The story is loosely based on the 19th-century Chinese novel The Seven Heroes and Five Gallants. The title refers to a nickname of the protagonist Zhan Zhao (the nickname can also be translated as "Imperial Cat").

Plot
During the Song dynasty, after the upright prefect Bao Zheng executed Pang Yu for embezzlement, the grand tutor Pang Ji sent assassins to avenge his son's death. A chivalrous man, Zhan Zhao the "Southern Hero", saved Bao and was conferred the title "King Cat" by the emperor. This title invoked the jealousy and anger of Bai Yutang the "Brocade-Coated Rat" — as rats were considered cat food — who went to the capital Kaifeng (also known as Bianjing) to challenge Zhan. He was later joined by his 3 elder sworn brothers — Han Zhang the "Earth-Piercing Rat", Xu Qing the "Mountain-Boring Rat" and Jiang Ping the "River-Overturning Rat", and together they stole a treasure from the imperial palace, knowing that Bao would send Zhan to retrieve it.

On their way home, the four brothers were confronted by Bai's girlfriend Ding Yuehua the "Nine-Tailed Phoenix", who accused them of raping and killing 3 imperial maids whose corpses were discovered right after their theft. Infuriated by her lack of trust, Bai admitted to the crimes, and Ding broke up with him. The real criminal, however, was Hua Chong the "Flowery Butterfly", who had been involved with the treacherous grand tutor and his daughter Consort Pang, as well as a few Taoist priests in a plot to overthrow the dynasty. Hua tried to rape Ding, but fled after Zhan stopped him. Ding informed Zhan of Bai's guilt, so Zhan went to the island occupied by Lu Fang the "Sky-Penetrating Rat" and his four sworn brothers to arrest Bai, but was trapped under a fish pond. Ding Yuehua and his two brothers Ding Zhaolan and Ding Zhaohui arrived later looking for Zhan, and Zhan escaped from the trap. Finally Zhan discovered that Bai was not the rapist, and Jiang remembered overhearing a plot by Hua to rape Princess Yong'an during her visit to a monastery.

The heroes and gallants arrived in the monastery to rescue the princess, only to discover it was filled with rebellious priests. Helped by an army led by Bao, they eventually subdued the rebels and killed Hua. The "Five Rats" returned the treasure, and Zhan became romantically involved with Ding Yuehua.

Cast
Chang Yi as Zhan Zhao
Chiao Chuang as Bai Yutang
Pat Ting Hung as Ding Yuehua
Ching Li as Jinhua
Ching Miao as Bao Zheng
Chin Feng as Emperor Renzong of Song
Carrie Ku Mei as Princess Yong'an
Ku Wen-chung as Han Zhang
Huang Tsung Hsing as Xu Qing
Paul Wei Ping-ao as Jiang Ping
Yang Chih-ching as Lu Fang
Fang Mian as Gongsun Ce
Cliff Lok as Bao Xing
Lo Lieh as Hua Chong
Helen Ma Hoi-lun as Consort Pang
Tin Sam as Imperial Tutor Pang
Fan Dan as Pang Yu
Cheng Lei as Ding Zhaohui
Chao Hsiung as Ding Zhaolan
Wu Ma as Little Sun

References

External links

Trailer with English Subtitles

1967 films
Hong Kong martial arts films
Shaw Brothers Studio films
1960s Mandarin-language films
Wuxia films
1960s action films
Films based on The Seven Heroes and Five Gallants
Fictional depictions of Bao Zheng in film